The 2019 Conference USA football season was the 24th season of College Football play for Conference USA (C-USA). It was played from August 29, 2019 until January 2020. Conference USA consisted of 14 members in two divisions. It was part of the 2019 NCAA Division I FBS football season.

The conference consists of 14 members. The Conference USA Football Championship game was played on December 7.

Preseason

Preseason Awards
The conference preseason awards were released On July 15.

Preseason Offensive Player of the Year: Mason Fine, Senior, QB, North Texas
Preseason Defensive Player of the Year: Sage Lewis Sr, Senior, LB, FIU
Preseason Special Teams Player of the Year: Jonathan Cruz, Sophomore, Kicker, Charlotte

Media predictions
The 2019 preseason media football poll was released on July 16.
East Division
1. Marshall (14 First place votes)
2. FIU (9)
3. Florida Atlantic 
4. Middle Tennessee
5. WKU
6. Old Dominion
7. Charlotte
West Division
1. North Texas (20)
2. Southern Miss (4)
3. Louisiana Tech
4. UAB (2)
5. UTSA
6. Rice
7. UTEP

Head coaches
Note: All stats shown are before beginning of the season

Rankings

Schedule

Regular season

Week One

Week Two

Week Three

Week Four

Week Five

Week Six

Week Seven

Week Eight

Week Nine

Week Ten

Week Eleven

Week Twelve

Week Thirteen

Week Fourteen

Conference USA Championship Game

Postseason

Bowl games

Rankings are from CFP rankings. All times Central Time Zone. C-USA teams shown in bold.

Selection of teams
Bowl eligible: Florida Atlantic, Marshall, Western Kentucky, Charlotte, Florida International, UAB, Louisiana Tech, Southern Mississippi
Bowl-ineligible: Middle Tennessee, Old Dominion, Rice, North Texas, UTSA, UTEP

Awards and honors

Player of the week honors

C–USA Individual Awards
The following individuals received postseason honors as voted by the Conference USA football coaches at the end of the season

All-conference teams

 

*Denotes Unanimous Selection

Ref:

All Conference Honorable Mentions:

Offense:
QB – Chris Reynolds, R-So., Charlotte • 
QB – James Morgan, Gr., FIU • 
QB – Jack Abraham, R-Jr., Southern Miss • 
RB – Anthony Jones, R-Sr., FIU • 
RB – Tre Siggers, R-So., North Texas • 
RB – De’Michael Harris, Sr., Southern Miss • 
RB – Sincere McCormick, Fr., UTSA • 
OL – D’Ante Demery, Jr., FIU • 
OL – Devontay Taylor, R-Jr., FIU • 
OL – Desmond Noel, R-Jr., Florida Atlantic • 
OL – Willie Allen, R-Jr., Louisiana Tech • 
OL – Drew Kirkpatrick, R-Sr., Louisiana Tech • 
OL – Kody Russey, R-Jr., Louisiana Tech • 
OL – Gewhite Stallworth, R-Sr., Louisiana Tech • 
OL – Will Gilchrist, Jr., Middle Tennessee • 
OL – Robert Jones, Jr., Middle Tennessee • 
OL – Isaac Weaver, Jr., Old Dominion • 
OL – Shea Baker, R-So., Rice • 
OL – Brian Chaffin, Gr., Rice • 
OL – Justin Gooseberry, Gr., Rice • 
OL – Nick Leverett, Gr., Rice • 
OL – Arvin Fletcher, R-Jr., Southern Miss • 
OL – Colby Ragland, R-Jr., UAB • 
OL – Sidney Wells, Jr., UAB • 
OL – Bobby DeHaro, R-So., UTEP • 
OL – Spencer Burford, So., UTSA • 
OL – Josh Dunlop, Sr., UTSA • 
OL – Jordan Meredith, R-Jr., WKU • 
TE – John Raine, Sr., Florida Atlantic • 
TE – Jason Pirtle, R-Jr., North Texas • 
TE – Carlos Strickland II, Jr., UTSA • 
TE – Joshua Simon, Fr., WKU • 
WR – Victor Tucker, R-So., Charlotte • 
WR – Tony Gaiter IV, Sr., FIU • 
WR – Deangelo Antoine, Sr., Florida Atlantic • 
WR – Adrian Hardy, R-Jr., Louisiana Tech • 
WR – Malik Stanley, R-Sr., Louisiana Tech • 
WR – Jyaire Shorter, Fr., North Texas • 
WR – Brad Rozner, Jr., Rice • 
WR – Austin Trammell, Jr., Rice • 
WR – Myron Mitchell, R-Jr., UAB

Defense:
DT – Ray Ellis, Gr., Florida Atlantic • 
DT – Milton Williams, R-So., Louisiana Tech • 
DT – Dion Novil, Jr., North Texas • 
DT – Myles Adams, Sr., Rice • 
DT – Delmond Landry, R-Sr., Southern Miss • 
DT – Tony Fair, R-Jr., UAB • 
DT – Jaylon Haynes, Jr., UTSA • 
DT – Jeremy Darvin, R-Jr., WKU • 
DT – Jaylon George, R-Sr., WKU • 
DE – Markees Watts, So., Charlotte • 
DE – Tim Bonner, R-Sr., Florida Atlantic • 
DE – Willie Baker, R-Jr., Louisiana Tech • 
DE – Darius Hodge, R-So., Marshall • 
DE – LaDarius Hamilton, Sr., North Texas • 
DE – Derek Wilder, Sr., Old Dominion • 
DE – Jacques Turner, R-Jr., Southern Miss • 
DE – Fitzgerald Mofor, R-Sr., UAB • 
DE – Eric Banks, Sr., UTSA • 
DE – Jarrod Carter-McLin, Sr., UTSA • 
LB – Jeff Gemmell, R-Sr., Charlotte • 
LB – Rashad Smith, Sr., Florida Atlantic • 
LB – Collin Scott, R-Sr., Louisiana Tech • 
LB – Connor Taylor, Sr., Louisiana Tech • 
LB – KD Davis, So., North Texas • 
LB – Tyreke Davis, Jr., North Texas • 
LB – Racheem Boothe, R-Jr., Southern Miss • 
LB – Swayze Bozeman, Jr., Southern Miss • 
LB – Kyle Bailey, Jr., WKU • 
DB – Nafees Lyon, R-Sr., Charlotte • 
DB – Zyon Gilbert, Jr., Florida Atlantic • 
DB – James Pierre, Jr., Florida Atlantic • 
DB – Chris Tooley, Sr., Florida Atlantic • 
DB – Michael Sam, R-Sr., Louisiana Tech • 
DB – Nazeeh Johnson, R- Jr., Marshall • 
DB – Jovante Moffatt, Sr., Middle Tennessee • 
DB – Treshawn Chamberlain, So., Rice • 
DB – Ky’el Hemby, R-Jr., Southern Miss • 
DB – Rachuan Mitchell, R-Jr., Southern Miss • 
DB – Will Boler, R-So., UAB • 
DB – TD Marshall, R-Jr., UAB • 
DB – Dy’Jonn Turner, Jr., UAB • 
DB – Michael Lewis, R-Sr., UTEP • 
DB – Ta’Corian Darden, R-Sr., WKU • 
DB – Devon Key, R-Jr., WKU • 
DB – Antwon Kincade, Jr., WKU • 
DB – Trae Meadows, R-Jr., WKU

Special Teams:
K – Ethan Mooney, So., North Texas • 
K – Andrew Stein, Fr., Southern Miss • 
K – Nick Vogel, R-Sr., UAB • 
K – Gavin Baechle, So., UTEP • 
P – Tommy Heatherly, Jr., FIU • 
P – Alvin Kenworthy, R-Sr., North Texas • 
KR – Deangelo Antoine, Gr., Florida Atlantic • 
KR – Blake Watson, R-Fr., Old Dominion • 
KR – Myron Mitchell, R-Jr., UAB • 
KR – Duron Lowe, R-Jr., UTEP • 
PR – Darrell Brown, Sr., Old Dominion • 
PR – Justin Garrett, R-Jr., UTEP • 
LS – Jonathan Sullivan, Jr., Florida Atlantic • 
LS – Nate Durham, Jr., North Texas • 
LS – Campbell Riddle, So., Rice • 
LS – T.J. Harvey, R-Fr., Southern Miss • 
LS – Jacob Fuqua, R-Jr., UAB

All-Americans

The 2019 College Football All-America Teams are composed of the following College Football All-American first teams chosen by the following selector organizations: Associated Press (AP), Football Writers Association of America (FWAA), American Football Coaches Association (AFCA), Walter Camp Foundation (WCFF), The Sporting News (TSN), Sports Illustrated (SI), USA Today (USAT) ESPN, CBS Sports (CBS), FOX Sports (FOX) College Football News (CFN), Bleacher Report (BR), Scout.com, Phil Steele (PS), SB Nation (SB), Athlon Sports, Pro Football Focus (PFF) and Yahoo! Sports (Yahoo!).

Currently, the NCAA compiles consensus all-America teams in the sports of Division I-FBS football and Division I men's basketball using a point system computed from All-America teams named by coaches associations or media sources.  The system consists of three points for a first-team honor, two points for second-team honor, and one point for third-team honor.  Honorable mention and fourth team or lower recognitions are not accorded any points.  Football consensus teams are compiled by position and the player accumulating the most points at each position is named first team consensus all-American.  Currently, the NCAA recognizes All-Americans selected by the AP, AFCA, FWAA, TSN, and the WCFF to determine Consensus and Unanimous All-Americans. Any player named to the First Team by all five of the NCAA-recognized selectors is deemed a Unanimous All-American.

*AFCA All-America Team (AFCA)
*Walter Camp Football Foundation All-America Team (WCFF)
*Associated Press All-America Team (AP)
*The Sporting News All-America Team (TSN)
*Football Writers Association of America All-America Team (FWAA)
*Sports Illustrated All-America Team (SI)
*Bleacher Report All-America Team (BR)
*College Football News All-America Team (CFN)
*ESPN All-America Team (ESPN)
*CBS Sports All-America Team (CBS)
*Athlon Sports All-America Team (Athlon)

All-Academic

National award winners

John Mackey Award (Outstanding Tight End)
Harrison Bryant, Florida Atlantic

C-USA records vs Other Conferences
2019–2020 records against non-conference foes:

Regular Season

Post Season

C-USA vs Power Five matchups
This is a list of games the Sun Belt has scheduled versus power conference teams (ACC, Big 10, Big 12, Pac-12, BYU/Notre Dame and SEC). All rankings are from the current AP Poll at the time of the game.

C-USA vs Group of Five matchups
The following games include C-USA teams competing against teams from the American, MAC, Mountain West or Sun Belt.

C-USA vs FBS independents matchups
The following games include C-USA teams competing against FBS Independents, which includes Army, Liberty, New Mexico State, or UMass.

C–USA vs FCS matchups

Home game Attendance

Bold – Exceed capacity
†Season High

NFL Draft
The following list includes all C-USA players who were drafted in the 2020 NFL Draft.

References